Takhar University was a university established by Afghanistan former president Professor Burhanuddin Rabbani leader of Jamiat Islami Afghanistan and martyr of peace in Aqrab 1370 (i.e. October 1991) in Peshawar-Pakistan under the name of "Abdullah Ibn Massoud", and it was transferred to Taloqan city in 1373. By the year 1374 it was registered in the Ministry of Higher Education and in the same year it started its academic activities, establishing two faculties (law and agriculture).

As any other universities in Afghanistan, Takhar University was closed for students the during the Taliban era. Takhar University restarted its activities containing four faculties (law, literature, agriculture and education) after the establishment of temporary government in Afghanistan in 1381. It was transferred to its new building which is located in Wortabuz (an area 5 km west of Toloqan City) in the month of Hoot - 1378. 

By the beginning of 1388 it started its academic and administrative activities in two buildings (law faculties administrative and teaching buildings) and engineering faculty which was planned in the framework of this university was activated in early 1389. Currently (i.e. 2017) Takhar university has seven faculties and 27 departments. They are:

Islamic law (sharia) faculty which contains departments of Islamic studies, jurisprudence and law, belief and Islamic culture.
Agriculture faculty has three departments which are: agricultural economics extension, horticulture, and livestock.
Education faculty which contains departments: history, geography, mathematics, physic, chemistry, biology, Dari language and literature, and computer science.
Language and literature faculty which contains departments:  English, Dari, Pashto and Uzbeki.
Engineering faculty has two department: civil engineering, electronics, and geology and mining.
Economics faculty has two departments: BBA, finance and banking
Law and political science faculty has two departments which are: justice and attorney, and administrative and diplomacy.

Currently 7000 students are studying in Takhar University, which 2000 are female and 5000 are male. Takhar University has 153 lecturers, among these 17 of them are female and 136 are male and they are shown as follow:

PhD degree: 1
Studying for PhD degree: 5
Master's degree: 46
Studying for master's degree: 38
Bachelor's degree: 63

Table 1: Academic Ranking of Lecturers in 2017

Junior Teaching Assist. Nominated	Junior Teaching Assistant	Teaching Assistant Nominated	Teaching Assistant	Senior Teaching Assistant	Assistant Professor	Associate Professor	Professor
Female	Male	Female	Male	Female	Male	Female	Male	Female	Male	Female	Male	Female	Male	Female	Male
0	2	6	70	0	1	4	39	2	23	0	3	0	3	0	0
Total= 153

Divisions 

 Agriculture Faculty 
 Education Faculty
 Engineering Faculty 
 Languages and Literature Faculty 
 Medicine Faculty 
 Theology Faculty

Reference

External links

Universities in Afghanistan
Educational institutions established in 1955
1955 establishments in Afghanistan